Vladimir Vladimirovich Vdovichenkov (born 13 August 1971) is a Russian theater and screen actor known for his roles in Brigada (2002) Leviathan (2014), Bummer (2003) and Salyut 7 (2017).

Early life and education
Vdovichenkov was born in Gusev, Kaliningrad Oblast, Russian RSFSR, Soviet Union. He pursued boxing while at school.  After graduating from 42nd Kronstadt Nautical School in 1989, he served four years in the Northern Fleet and the Baltic Fleet. He worked as a waiter while taking preparatory acting courses. As a student he appeared in music videos and commercials.

Career
In 2000, While Vdovichenkov was a fourth-year student at the Gerasimov Institute of Cinematography, director Alexey Sidorov cast him in a main role in the crime television series Brigada. This brought him fame in Russia and other Russian-speaking countries.
In 2001, Vdovichenkov graduated from Gerasimov Institute of Cinematography. He has performed at the Vakhtangov State Academic Theater since 2002.

In 2015, he married Elena Lyadova – his co-star in Leviathan (2014).

Filmography
Film and television work

References

External links

1971 births
Living people
People from Gusev
Russian male film actors
Russian male television actors
Russian male stage actors
20th-century Russian male actors
21st-century Russian male actors
Honored Artists of the Russian Federation